The Salassi or Salasses were a Gallic or Ligurian tribe dwelling in the upper valley of the Dora Baltea river, near present-day Aosta (Val d'Aosta), during the Iron Age and the Roman period.

Name 
They are mentioned as dià Salassō̃n (διὰ Σαλασσῶν) by Polybius (2nd c. BC) and Strabo (early 1st c. AD), as Salassi by Livy (late 1st c. BC), as Salassos by Pliny (1st c. AD), as Salasíon (Σαλασίον) by Ptolemy (2nd c. AD), as Salassoí (Σαλασσοί) by Appian (2nd c. AD).

The origin of the ethnic name Salassi remains unclear. If Celtic, it may derive from the root sal-, with various possible explanations regarding the word-formation. According to Cato the Elder and Strabo, the Salassi were a Ligurian tribe.

Geography 
The Salassi lived in the upper valley of the Dora Baltea river, where they controlled the Great and Little St Bernard passes in the Alps, collecting road tolls, and gold and iron mines. Their territory was located south of the Veragri, north of the Iemerii and Taurini, west of the Lepontii, Montunates and Votodrones, east of the Acitavones. According to Cato, they were part of the Taurisci.

History 
They were subjugated by the Roman forces of Claudius in 143 BC. The Roman Republic took over the rich gold deposits, and a colony was later planted in 100 BC at Eporedia (Ivrea) to take control of the Alpine route into the Po Valley and guard over the Salassi. 

Relations with the Romans were not uniformly peaceful; Strabo mentions that the Salassi robbed Julius Caesar's treasury and threw rocks on his legions on the grounds that they were making roads and building bridges. There may have been a Roman campaign against the Salassi in 35 or 34 BC, launched from the valley of the Isère river under Antistius Vetus or Marcus Valerius Messalla Corvinus. 

For their last decade of freedom the Salassi – alongside some other, mainly Alpine, tribes subjugated by 14 BC – were almost the only remaining groups not under Roman control in the Mediterranean basin. After the Battle of Actium in 31 BC the Roman world was united under one ruler, Augustus, who could concentrate Roman forces against remaining holdouts. 

They were definitely conquered by Aulus Terentius Varro Murena in 25 BC, and the colony of Augusta Praetoria (modern Aosta) was founded in the following year with 3,000 settlers. Strabo records that two thousand Salassi were killed and all the survivors, nearly 40,000 men, women, and children, were taken to Eporedia and sold into slavery. However, some remained; an inscription found near the west gate of Augusta Praetoria Salassorum is a dedication to Augustus dated 23 BC of a statue (?) by "the Salassi who had joined the colony from its beginning."

References

Primary sources

Bibliography

Historical Celtic peoples
Gauls
Ligures
Ancient peoples of Italy
Tribes conquered by the Roman Republic
Tribes conquered by Rome
Aosta